John Howard Rutsey (July 23, 1952 – May 11, 2008) was a Canadian musician best known as a founding member and original drummer of Rush. He performed on the band's 1974 debut album, but left shortly after its release due to health problems which limited his ability to tour with the band. He was subsequently replaced by Neil Peart, who would remain the drummer of Rush on the band's future recordings and for the rest of its active history.

Biography

Personal life
Rutsey was the son of Toronto Telegram crime reporter Howard Rutsey. He had an older brother named Bill, and a younger brother named Mike who became a baseball writer. Following the death of their father by heart attack, the brothers were raised by their mother, Eva.

Rutsey was a student at St. Patrick’s School, and it was there that he met Gary Weinrib and Alex Zivojinovich (who would later change their names to Geddy Lee and Alex Lifeson respectively). Whereas Lee and Lifeson were listening to progressive rock bands such as Yes, Pink Floyd and Genesis at that time, Rutsey drew more inspiration from the harder styles of bands such as Bad Company.

Formation of Rush
Rutsey and Lifeson became close friends while attending St. Paschals School, and the pair would play street hockey together in their neighborhood. Both were interested in rock music, and talked often about forming a band. Together, they initially were members of the bands The Projection with Bill Fitzgerald and "Doc" Cooper. Eventually another school friend, Lee, joined them and the earliest version of Rush was formed.

Rutsey's commitment has been credited with providing the band's early direction, as it was he who took the band most seriously and he who would insist on regular practice sessions. According to Ian Grandy, a member of the band's early roadcrew, "I've said it before and I'll say it again: There would have been no 'Rush' without John." At Rutsey's suggestion, Rush was initially a glam rock band. "John led the guys as far as being 'glam rockers', with really flashy jackets and pants, and eight-inch high boots", according to Grandy. "One time, he was speaking to me at the Gasworks and I said, 'Didn't we used to be the same height (5'8")?' He laughed and said 'Well, maybe a long time ago!

It was Rutsey's brother, Bill, who came up with the name Rush for the band during a rehearsal in the Rutsey family basement in mid 1968.

Career
The band formed with Rutsey on drums, Lifeson on guitars, and Jeff Jones on vocals and bass, but after their first concert Jones left and was succeeded by Lee. During these early years, Rutsey played on the "Not Fade Away"/"You Can't Fight It" single as well as the debut album.

Lee and Lifeson have each acknowledged that during the writing and recording sessions for the band's debut album, Rutsey was given the role of chief lyricist. When the time came to start recording, however, he did not deliver any lyrics. In interviews, Lee and Lifeson have both said that Rutsey was dissatisfied with what he had written and had torn up the lyric sheets. Lee hastily wrote the lyrics to all the songs before recording the vocal tracks.

Soon after Rush released its debut album, Rutsey left the band, due to musical differences, health concerns related to diabetes, and his general distaste for touring. Rutsey's final performance with the group was on July 25, 1974, at Centennial Hall in London, Ontario. He was replaced by Neil Peart.

Later life
Lifeson stated in a 1989 interview that he still often had seen Rutsey, and after leaving the band Rutsey went into bodybuilding. Lifeson remarked, "He competed on an amateur level for a while, doing that for a few years, and has sort of been in and out of that, but he still works out, and I work out with him a few times a week at a local gym – at a Gold's, here in Toronto." In 2005, Lifeson said that he had not seen Rutsey since around 1990.

Death
On May 11, 2008, Rutsey died in his sleep of an apparent heart attack, related to complications from diabetes. Rutsey's family wished to keep the funeral a private affair, although donations would be sent to the Juvenile Diabetes Research Foundation in Markham, Ontario.

Aftermath
After Rutsey's death, Lee and Lifeson released this statement: "Our memories of the early years of Rush when John was in the band are very fond to us. Those years spent in our teens dreaming of one day doing what we continue to do decades later are special. Although our paths diverged many years ago, we smile today, thinking back on those exciting times and remembering John's wonderful sense of humour and impeccable timing. He will be deeply missed by all he touched."

Rutsey's part in the band's early history is acknowledged in the 2010 documentary Rush: Beyond the Lighted Stage. Tape-recorded comments from him are heard during the film, and the DVD release includes two performances with him on drums in its bonus features. A third performance is included as a bonus feature on the Time Machine 2011: Live in Cleveland home video release.

Rutsey is buried in the Mount Pleasant Cemetery in Toronto.

Discography 
Single:
1973: "Not Fade Away" / "You Can't Fight It" (with Rush)

Studio album:
1974: Rush (with Rush)

References

External Links
 
 

1952 births
2008 deaths
Canadian heavy metal drummers
Canadian male drummers
Canadian rock drummers
Deaths from diabetes
Musicians from Toronto
People with type 1 diabetes
Rush (band) members
20th-century Canadian drummers
20th-century Canadian male musicians